Ada Milea (born August 5, 1975) is a Romanian singer and actress. Ada has written several film scores. She has supported a community under threat from a mining company by volunteering her talents for a festival.

Life
Milea was born in Târgu Mureș. She attended the University of Arts of Târgu Mureș. She worked at the National Theatre of Targu Mures, in 
1997. She left to try her own career in 1999. The album Absurdistan was recorded by Milea in 2002.

In 2005 she was one of the performers volunteering their time for FanFest which was a concert in support of Roșia Montană a community under threat from mining.

She wrote the music for the award winning film Elevator which was released in 2008. It was an independent film with two actors which was directed by George Dorobanțu and written by  based on his own play.

Milea & Alexander Balanescu published the CD The Island - featuring the Balanescu Quartet in 2011.

In 2019 Milea headlined at London's 'Europalia Romania' festival. She was joined by the Balanescu Quartet to perform a work by Gellu Naum based on the story of Robinson Crusoe which had its 300th birthday. In 2022 she opened the 26th Arad International Classical Theater Festival with comedic puns.

References

Romanian actresses
Romanian women singers
1975 births
Living people
People from Târgu Mureș